The Matrix Resurrections (Original Motion Picture Soundtrack) is a 2021 soundtrack album from the  film, The Matrix Resurrections. WaterTower released the album on December 22, 2021.

Development
In September 2021, Warner Bros. confirmed that Johnny Klimek and Tom Tykwer would be scoring the film, having previously collaborated with Wachowski on Sense8 and Cloud Atlas, replacing Don Davis, who composed the score for the first three films, though Klimek and Tykwer feature themes and material written by Davis for the original Matrix films.

The soundtrack was released on December 17, 2021. A track from the album titled "Neo and Trinity Theme (Johnny Klimek & Tom Tykwer Exomorph Remix)" was released as a single on December 10.

Track listing
All music composed by Johnny Klimek and Tom Tykwer except where otherwise noted.

 Track contains excerpts from The Matrix courtesy of Don Davis.

Personnel
 Johnny Klimek and Tom Tykwer - Composers, Album Producers
 Lana Wachowski - Executive Album Producer
 Gene Pritsker, Justin Bell, Gabriel Mounsey, Marcel Dettmann - Additional Music
 Robert Ames and Hugh Brunt - Conductors
 Gabriel Mounsey - Supervising Music Editor
 Hans Hafner and Jonathan Shanes - Music Editors
 Gene Pritsker - Lead Orchestrator
 Justin Bell - Orchestrator
 Justin Bell, Hans Hafner, Fabio Senna, Valerio Mina - Score Programmers
 Howard Scarr, Urs Heckmann, Viktor Weimer - Synth Programmers
 Gabriel Mounsey - Score Mixer
 Guacimara De Elizaga and Harry George - Music Coordinators

See also
 "White Rabbit", 1967 song

References

The Matrix (franchise) albums
2021 soundtrack albums
2020s film soundtrack albums
Film scores
WaterTower Music soundtracks